The Highland Brigade is a historical unit of the British Army, which has been formed and reformed a number of times. It recruited men from the Highlands of Scotland.

Crimean War

A Highland Brigade was present at the Crimean War (1854–1856), as part of the 1st Division; it was initially under the command of Major-General Sir Colin Campbell (Lord Clyde). It played a significant role in the Battle of Alma.

This Highland Brigade consisted of the: 
 42nd (Royal Highland) Regiment of Foot
 79th (The Queen's Own Cameron Highlanders) Regiment of Foot
 93rd (Sutherland Highlanders) Regiment of Foot.

Egyptian Rebellion
There was a Highland Brigade operating in Egypt from 1882, during the Egyptian Rebellion (1882–1885), under the command of Major General Archibald Alison. Major General Alison's Brigade formed the left wing of General Sir Garnet Wolseley's army at the Battle of Tel-El-Kebir where they suffered 243 casualties (from the total casualties for Wolsey's force of 339). 

This Highland brigade consisted of the:
 2nd Battalion, Highland Light Infantry
 1st Battalion, Black Watch (Royal Highlanders)
 1st Battalion, Cameron Highlanders
 1st Battalion, Gordon Highlanders

Second Boer War

A Highland Brigade participated in the Second Boer War (1899–1902) in South Africa, under the command of Major General Andrew Gilbert Wauchope. It suffered severe losses at the battle Magersfontein (including General Wauchope). Command of the Brigade was then given to Major General Hector MacDonald who led the brigade throughout the remainder of the war. The Brigade fought at the Battle of Paardeberg where on 18 February 1900 (known as Bloody Sunday) it again suffered heavy casualties.

On its formation in 1899, the Highland Brigade consisted of the:
 2nd Battalion, Black Watch
 2nd Battalion, Seaforth Highlanders
 1st Battalion, Argyll and Sutherland Highlanders
 1st Battalion, Highland Light Infantry
In February 1900 the Highland Light Infantry transferred to the 19th Brigade under Major-General Horace Smith-Dorrien, and the Gordon Highlanders joined the Highland Brigade.

References

External links
 The Black Watch – 1854 – 1856
 The Black Watch (Royal Highlanders)
Military of Scotland